The Men's Triple Jump F11 had its Final held on September 12 at 11:05.

Medalists

Results

References
Final

Athletics at the 2008 Summer Paralympics